Maliu Filise (born 1 July 1958) is a Tongan former rugby union player. He played as number eight.

Career
Filise's first cap for Tonga was against Fiji in Nuku'alofa, on 28 June 1987. In the same year, he was part of the Tonga squad for the 1987 Rugby World Cup, where he played two matches, with his last test being against Ireland, in Brisbane, on 3 June 1987.

References

External links

1950s births
Living people
Tongan rugby union players
Rugby union number eights
Tonga international rugby union players